This Fool Can Die Now is the fourth studio album by singer-songwriter Scout Niblett, released on Too Pure records. The album was Niblett's third collaboration with producer Steve Albini. The album also features several duets and collaborations with Will Oldham.

Track listing

Personnel
Scout Niblett - vocals, guitar, drums
Alison Chesley - cello
Kristian Goddard - drums
Will Oldham - vocals (tracks 1-2, 7, 13), guitar
Chris Saligoe - guitar
Susan Voelz - violin, vocals

Technical personnel 
Steve Albini - engineer

References

2007 albums
Scout Niblett albums
Albums produced by Steve Albini